André Werner (born 4 June 1960 in Bremerhaven) is a German composer of classical music.

Werner studied classical guitar and oboe at the Musikhochschule Bremen from 1980 to 1986, composition from 1986 to 1992 at the Hochschule der Künste Berlin with Frank Michael Beyer. He was a Stipendiat of the Villa Massimo in 1995/96, and won an Ernst von Siemens Composers' Prize in 2001.

His opera Marlowe: Der Jude von Malta on his own libretto after the play The Jew of Malta by Christopher Marlowe was premiered at the Munich Biennale in 2002.

References

External links 
 
 

German opera composers
Male opera composers
20th-century classical composers
21st-century classical composers
1960 births
People from Bremerhaven
Living people
Berlin University of the Arts alumni
German male classical composers
20th-century German composers
Ernst von Siemens Composers' Prize winners
21st-century German composers
20th-century German male musicians
21st-century German male musicians